Dark Shadows is an American supernatural daytime TV series which originally aired from 1966 to 1971.

Dark Shadows may refer to:

Television 
Dark Shadows, the original daytime TV series, which aired from 1966 to 1971
Dark Shadows (1991 TV series), adaptation of the original 1966 series
Dark Shadows (2004), pilot for a proposed adaptation of the 1966 series
"Dark Shadows" (Mad Men), 2012 episode of Mad Men

Film
 House of Dark Shadows, 1970 film adaptation of the 1966 series
 Curse of Dark Shadows, 1971 proposed sequel to the 1970 film
 Night of Dark Shadows, 1971 film inspired by the 1966 series
 Dark Shadows (film), 2012 film adaptation of the 1966 series

Radio 
 Dark Shadows (Return to Collinwood), based on a stageplay
 Dark Shadows (Big Finish Productions)

Other

 Dark Shadows (1944), an American crime drama short film starring Henry O'Neill; unrelated to the later supernatural TV series